The Men's 1500 metre freestyle competition of the 2020 European Aquatics Championships was held on 18 and 19 May 2021.

Records
Before the competition, the existing world, European and championship records were as follows.

Results

Heats
The heats were started on 18 May at 11:21.

Final
The final was held on 19 May at 18:00.

References

External links

Men's 1500 metre freestyle